Chapters is the fourth album by Irish grunge band Paradox, released on January 24, 2015. It is the first album by the band to feature Maeve Kelly on cello.

Track listing

Credits
Pete Mac – Guitar, vocals, Bass and Drums
Mike Mac – Drums
Maeve Kelly - Cello

External links 
 Bandcamp

2015 albums
Paradox (Irish band) albums